Imre Bennett Leader (born 30 October 1963) is a professor of pure mathematics at Cambridge University  and a professional  Othello player.

As a child, he was a pupil at the private St Paul's School and won a silver medal on the British team at the 1981 International Mathematical Olympiad (IMO) for pre-undergraduates.

Between 1983 (aged 20) and 2019 (aged 54) he was 15 times the British champion at the Othello boardgame. In 1983 he came second in the world individual championship, and in 1988 he played on the British team that won the world team championship. In 2019 he won the European championship, beating Matthias Berg in the final in Berlin.

In mathematics he gained a PhD in 1989 for work on combinatorics, supervised by Béla Bollobás.

Between 1999 and 2001 he was the chief trainer of pre-undergraduates for the British IMO team. During his trainership, the team achieved an average of 24th place (finishing 20th, 22nd, and 31st, still its lowest ever placing), compared with the average 8th place that British teams had achieved under previous trainers since first participating in the event in 1967.

Since 2000, when he was aged 37, he has been a fellow of Trinity College, Cambridge, the college where he previously worked as an undergraduate.

He is the godson of mathematical philosopher Imre Lakatos of the London School of Economics.

References

External links
 Some publications from DBLP 

Living people
Reversi players
20th-century British mathematicians
21st-century British mathematicians
Combinatorialists
People educated at St Paul's School, London
Alumni of Trinity College, Cambridge
Fellows of Trinity College, Cambridge
Cambridge mathematicians
1963 births
Whitehead Prize winners
International Mathematical Olympiad participants